Basuari is a village and post-office in Madhubani district in the Indian state of Bihar India. 60% of the population is educated.

Demographics
 India census, Basuari had a population of 1565 in 356 households. Males constitute 53.27% of the population and females 42.73%.Basuari has an average literacy rate of 42.24%, lower than the national average of 74%: male literacy is 62%, and female literacy is 37%. In Basuari 23.32% of the population is under 6 years of age.

References

Villages in West Champaran district